EMBRACE (A European Model for Bioinformatics Research and Community Education) was a project from the years 2005 to 2010, with the objective of drawing together a wide group of European experts involved in using information technology in the biomolecular sciences. The EMBRACE Network endeavored to integrate major bioinformatics databases and software tools, using existing methods and emerging grid service technologies.

Integration efforts were driven by a set of test problems representing key issues for bioinformatics service providers and end-user biologists.  EMBRACE made many bioinformatics web services available to the international research community. As a result, groups throughout Europe were able to use the EMBRACE service interfaces for their own local or proprietary data and tools.  The project was run from the EBI in Hinxton, England. Fred Marcus was its EU project coordinator.

The EMBRACE project was funded by the European Commission within its FP6 Programme, under the thematic area "Life sciences, genomics, and biotechnology for health", contract number LHSG-CT-2004-512092.

References

External links
 http://cordis.europa.eu/project/rcn/74095_en.html

Bioinformatics
Grid computing